Ludwigslust is a former Kreis (district) in the southwest of Mecklenburg-Vorpommern, Germany.  Neighboring districts were (from the north clockwise) Nordwestmecklenburg, the district-free city Schwerin, Parchim, Prignitz in Brandenburg, Lüchow-Dannenberg and Lüneburg in Lower Saxony and the district Lauenburg in Schleswig-Holstein. The district was disbanded at the district reform of September 2011. Its territory has been part of the Ludwigslust-Parchim district since.

Geography
The district was situated roughly between the river Elbe and the city of Schwerin. Before the 2011 district reform, it was the largest district of Mecklenburg-Vorpommern, but very sparsely populated.

History
After the German reunification the two districts of Hagenow and Ludwigslust were established. In 1994 both together, with the two Ämter of Rastow and Stralendorf from the district of Schwerin-Land, were merged to an enlarged district of Ludwigslust. This district was merged with the district of Parchim at the district reform of September 2011, forming the new Ludwigslust-Parchim district.

Coat of arms

Towns and municipalities
The subdivisions of the district were (situation August 2011):

References

External links

Official website (German)
A visit to Ludwigslust in 2005, describes some history.  (English)

Former districts of Mecklenburg-Western Pomerania